The 1935 Oregon Webfoots football team represented the University of Oregon in the Pacific Coast Conference (PCC) during the 1935 college football season.  In their fourth season under head coach Prink Callison, the Webfoots compiled a 6–3 record (3–2 against PCC opponents), finished in a tie for fourth place in the PCC, and outscored their opponents, 70 to 63. The team played its home games at Hayward Field in Eugene, Oregon.

Schedule

References

Oregon
Oregon Ducks football seasons
Oregon Webfoots football